Garland Jeffreys (born June 29, 1943) is an American singer and songwriter in rock and roll, reggae, blues, and soul music.

Career
Jeffreys is from Sheepshead Bay, Brooklyn, of African American and Puerto Rican heritage. He majored in art history at Syracuse University, where he met Lou Reed before The Velvet Underground became active. In 1966, Jeffreys began to play in Manhattan nightclubs including Gerde's Folk City, The Bitter End, Gaslight, Kenny's Castaways and later Reno Sweeney, where he began to explore racially conscious themes in his work, sometimes utilizing blackface masks and a rag doll named Ramon in performance. Jeffreys played guitar on John Cale's 1969 debut solo album Vintage Violence and contributed the song "Fairweather Friend". In 1969 he founded Grinder's Switch with Woodstock-area musicians including pianist Stan Szelest, guitarist Ernie Corallo, and percussionist Sandy Konikoff. Lewis Merenstein, producer of Van Morrison's Astral Weeks, produced this one album before the band dissolved in 1970.

In 1973, he released his first solo album, Garland Jeffreys, on Atlantic Records. Around the same time Atlantic also released a single, "Wild in the Streets," that was not included on the album. Jeffreys wrote the song after hearing about a pre-teen rape and murder in the Bronx. Dr. John played clavinet and helped arrange the song, with backing from guitarist David Spinozza, drummer Rick Marotta, the Brecker Brothers on horns and David Peel on background vocals. After the single's rerelease in 1977, the track received airplay on the progressive FM album-oriented rock radio stations, and became one of his best-known songs and something of an unofficial anthem for the skate community after the cover by The Circle Jerks was featured in the 1986 film Thrashin'. It has been covered by several musicians, including:
 The Circle Jerks, on the 1980 Posh Boy album Rodney On The Roq
 The Circle Jerks, their re-recording on the 1982 album Wild in the Streets
 Chris Spedding, on the album Hurt
 British Lions, on their album British Lions
 Hot Water Music, on the 1999 compilation Twelve Ounces of Courage (Songs About Drinking Episode Three)
 Hurriganes, on Fortissimo
 Electric Frankenstein, on We Will Bury You
 Leæther Strip, on Æppreciation IV

In 1977 Garland recorded his Ghost Writer album for A&M Records, with "Wild in the Streets" included on side two. Many of the tracks are autobiographical, encompassing bittersweet tales about coming of age as an artist in the big city ("Ghost Writer"), of racial separatism ("Why-O"), of interracial romance ("I May Not Be Your Kind"), and of overcoming conflict at home ("Cool Down Boy").

The next years saw a string of albums, five within five years, and the release of "Matador" (1979) from American Boy & Girl, which charted in the top five of a number of countries. This burst of productivity culminated with Guts for Love, a meditation on the challenges of monogamy and fidelity. After a break, much of it spent woodshedding, reading and researching, Jeffreys released Don't Call Me Buckwheat, devoted to the complexities of race in America. The title was triggered by an incident at Shea Stadium where Jeffreys, enjoying the game and feeling carefree, stood to go get a hotdog when a voice shouted "Hey buckwheat, sit down!" The casual epithet was a jolt and it spurred a number of memorable songs, including "Don't Call Me Buckwheat," "I Was Afraid of Malcolm" and "Racial Repertoire." In February 1992, Jeffreys' recording of "Hail Hail Rock 'n' Roll" (RCA PB49171), was a big success in Germany where it reached No. 11. It also spent one week at No. 72 in the UK Singles Chart.

After taking a lengthy hiatus to regroup and raise his only child, daughter Savannah, now "an impressive composer and singer herself" Jeffreys began to perform again in the summer of 2001, and on December 6 he joined Bruce Springsteen at his legendary Christmas show in Asbury Park and began to also perform annually at the Springsteen supported The Light of Day Foundation shows to fund research for Parkinson's and other neurological conditions. With his band loosely referred to as "The Coney Island Playboys" on September 4, 2003, Jeffreys joined Jon Langford, Lenny Kaye and Ivan Julian in a benefit concert for Alejandro Escovedo, recovering from hepatitis C. Jeffreys was featured in the 2003 documentary The Soul of a Man, directed by Wim Wenders as the fourth installment of documentary film series The Blues, produced by Martin Scorsese. The film explored the musical careers of blues musicians Skip James, Blind Willie Johnson and J. B. Lenoir. Jeffreys was also featured on the cover of Beyond Race Magazine in February 2007.

After a long career on major labels, in 2011 Jeffreys formed his own Luna Park Records label and went back into the studio, resulting in the critically acclaimed comeback album The King of in Between. Co-produced by Larry Campbell and with players Steve Jordan, Brian Mitchell, Pino Palladino, Duncan Sheik and Junior Marvin it yielded the song "Coney Island Winter", performed on The David Letterman Show. "Roller Coaster Town" was voted a "best of the year" in the WFUV staff poll and audience poll. The album made numerous annual Best Of lists with NPR naming it a "best of the year so far" and Rolling Stone calling it one of the Best Under The Radar Albums of 2011. The album won a third quarter of 2012 Schallplattenkritik Bestenliste prize in the Pop Rock category and in 2013 Jeffreys was also awarded the Italian Tenco Prize. In 2016, he was inducted into the Long Island Music Hall of Fame.

The Circle Jerks cover of "Wild in the Streets" was used in a commercial for Vans sneakers and can be heard in the 2012 video game Max Payne 3. Other TV and film placements for "Wild in the Streets" include Life on Mars, The Get Down on Netflix (also included on the official soundtrack), and a L'Oreal commercial directed by Louis de Caunes. On May 28, 2012, at the Pinkpop Festival in Landgraaf, Holland, Jeffreys joined Bruce Springsteen and The E Street Band onstage for a performance of ? and the Mysterians' 1966 hit "96 Tears" which Jeffreys had covered on his 1981 album Escape Artist.

In September 2013, Jeffreys released the single "Any Rain" from his album Truth Serum on the LunaPark/Thirty Tigers label.[9] The album was crowd funded on PledgeMusic, co-produced by James Maddock and recorded at Brooklyn Recording and featured again Larry Campbell, Steve Jordan and Brian Mitchell.

On April 20, 2019, Jeffreys announced on his website that "I’ve decided to hang up my rock and roll shoes" and that in the future he would continue to write but would not perform regularly. His July 8, 2019 performance at the Olympia in Montreal, opening for Little Steven and the Disciples of Soul was listed as the final concert.

Discography

Solo
 1970: Grinder's Switch featuring Garland Jeffreys
 1973: Garland Jeffreys
 1977: Ghost Writer
 1978: One-Eyed Jack
 1979: American Boy & Girl
 1981: Escape Artist
 1981: Rock 'n' Roll Adult
 1983: Guts For Love
 1992: Don't Call Me Buckwheat
 1992: Matador & More...
 1997: Wildlife Dictionary (only released in Europe)
 2007: I'm Alive (only released in Europe)
 2011: The King of In Between
 2013: Truth Serum
 2017: 14 Steps To Harlem

Singles

Contribution to others
 1970 John Cale Vintage Violence (Columbia) Jeffreys wrote "Fairweather Friend". 
 1976 Lou Reed Rock and Roll Heart (Arista) Jeffreys sang background vocals on "You Wear It So Well"
 1998 Diamond Cuts: Turning Two (Vol. II) (Hungry For Music)
 2003 Johnny's Blues: A Tribute To Johnny Cash (Northern Blues)
 2003 Light of Day Tribute To Bruce Springsteen (Schoolhouse Records)
 2003 Martin Scorsese Presents The Blues: The Soul Of A Man (Sony)
 2005 Elliott Murphy: Live Hot Point (Last Call Records)
 2011 Occupy This Album: 99 Songs for the 99 Percent (Music for Occupy)

References

External links
 
 Facebook Page
 Career Retrospective Interview from September 2015 with Pods & Sods
Interview with Garland Jeffreys, 1983-12-01, In Black America; KUT Radio, American Archive of Public Broadcasting (WGBH and the Library of Congress),

Living people
1943 births
American people of Puerto Rican descent
American male guitarists
Singer-songwriters from New York (state)
American rock guitarists
African-American male singers
American rock singers
American male singers
American acoustic guitarists
American blues guitarists
American rhythm and blues guitarists
American soul guitarists
American soul singers
American rhythm and blues singers
A&M Records artists
Atlantic Records artists
Epic Records artists
RCA Records artists
Guitarists from New York (state)
Musicians from Brooklyn
20th-century American guitarists
20th-century American male musicians
People from Sheepshead Bay, Brooklyn
African-American songwriters
African-American guitarists